The Fort Wayne Hoosiers minor league baseball team played in the Northwestern League in 1883 and 1884. Based in Fort Wayne, Indiana, the team played its home games at The Grand Duchess. 

Many major league players spent time with the team, including seven-year veteran John Kerins and ten-year veteran Jack Remsen.

References

Defunct minor league baseball teams
Baseball teams established in 1883
1883 establishments in Indiana
Defunct baseball teams in Indiana
Sports in Fort Wayne, Indiana
Baseball teams disestablished in 1884
1884 disestablishments in Indiana
Northwestern League teams